Lipovica is a locality near Bare in the Leposavić municipality in northern Kosovo, at the border with Serbia.

There are several villages named Lipovica in Kosovo and Serbia.

Annotations

References

Villages in Leposavić